Eszbieta Dadok is a Polish Paralympic skier. She represented her country in Paralympic Alpine skiing at the 1984 Winter Paralympic Games in Innsbruck, and 1988 Winter Paralympic Games. She won five bronze medals.

Career 
At the 1984 Winter Paralympic Games in Innsbruck, Dadok finished 3rd in the  LW6 / 8 slalom race in 1:22.81 (on the podium Gunilla Ahren, gold medal, who finished the race in 1:16.04 and Kathy Poohachof, silver medal in 1:17.04), and Dadok finished third again,  in the  LW6 / 8 alpine super-combined (with 3:47.19, behind Gunilla Ahren and Kathy Poohachof), and finished third in LW6 / 8 giant slalom; Dadok finished fourth in downhill. Dadok took another bronze medal in the LW3 slalom.

At the 1988 Winter Paralympics in Innsbruck, Dadok finished in 3rd place in the slalom, and giant slalom,  and in 5th place in the downhill.

At the 1992 Winter Paralympics,  in Albertville, Dadok competed in the LW5 / 7.6 / 8 category, finishing fourth in the super-G, fifth in the slalom and sixth in both giant slalom and downhill races.

References 

Paralympic bronze medalists for Poland
Year of birth missing (living people)
Living people